James R. McNutt (born January 28, 1935) is a former member of the Michigan House of Representatives.

Early life
McNutt was born on January 28, 1935.

Education
McNutt earned a bachelor's degree and a master's degree from Michigan State University.

Career
McNutt served as Midland County sheriff from 1977 to 1990. McNutt was sworn in as the member of the Michigan House of Representatives from the 102nd district on January 4, 1991, and served in this position until 1992. He then represented the 98th district from 1993 to 1998.

Personal life
McNutt married Mary Jane. Together, they had three children. McNutt was a Kiwanian.

References

Living people
1935 births
Michigan State University alumni
Michigan sheriffs
Republican Party members of the Michigan House of Representatives
20th-century American politicians